Shaheen Bagh is a neighbourhood in the South Delhi district of Delhi, India. It is on the U.P border and southernmost colony of the Okhla (Jamia Nagar) area, situated along the banks of the Yamuna. The locality is known for being the site of gathering for the protest against the Citizenship (Amendment) Act (CAA), National Register of Citizens (NRC) and National Population Register (NPR).

Etymology
Shaheen Bagh is named after the Shaheen falcon, with Shaheen itself being a Persian word. The name was chosen from a poem of Allama Iqbal's (Muhammad Iqbal) called Bal-e-Jibril (Gabriel's Wing). The area started to be populated in the early to mid 1980s.

Connectivity
This area has connectivity to nearby commercial and official areas such as Noida, Nehru Place, Sarita Vihar, Jasola, Okhla Industrial Area, Kalindi Kunj and Okhla Railway Station. It also has connectivity to universities like Jamia Millia Islamia, Jamia Hamdard, and Amity University. A metro train railway station named as Jasola Vihar Shaheen Bagh metro station connects Shaheen Bagh to the Delhi metro network. A metro train station is present in Sarita Vihar, around 1–2 km from Shaheen Bagh. Buses for major routes start from nearby Kalindi Kunj.

Protest Site
This place is widely known for the Shaheen Bagh protests held during the nation-wide movement against the CAA, NRC and NPR. The protests were mainly led by Muslim women of Shaheen Bagh in a form sit-in for more than 4 months. They blocked the highway connecting Noida inspired by the call of Sharjeel Imam for 'Chakka Jam' (traffic block).

References

Neighbourhoods in Delhi
New Delhi
South Delhi district